Assumption Parish School Board is a school district headquartered in the unincorporated area of Assumption Parish, Louisiana, United States. The district serves Assumption Parish.

School uniforms
The district requires its students to wear school uniforms.

Schools
Schools are located in unincorporated areas.

Secondary schools
 Assumption High School

PreK-8 schools
 Pierre Part Elementary School

Middle schools
 Belle Rose Middle School
 Labadieville Middle School
 Napoleonville Middle School
 Pierre Part Middle School

Primary schools 
 Bayou L'Ourse Primary School
 Belle Rose Primary School
 Labadieville Primary School
 Napoleonville Primary School

References

External links 
 

School districts in Louisiana
Education in Assumption Parish, Louisiana